Daryl Abbas (born November 13, 1983) is an American politician. He is a Republican member of the New Hampshire Senate representing District 22. He was first elected to the Senate on November 8, 2022. He previously served in the New Hampshire House of Representatives from 2018 to 2022.

References 

1983 births
Living people